Belluru  is a village in the southern state of Karnataka, India. It is located in the Nagamangala taluk of Mandya district in Karnataka.

The village has an ancient temple of Adi Madavaraya, (Vishnu). Said to be constructed during Saint Ramanujacharya stay in Melkote.

Location
Belluru is located between Nagamangala and Adichunchanagiri Hills.

Overbridge
The Belluru over-bridge separates the Tumkur-Mysore road from the Bangalore-Mangalore road.

Demographics
 India census, Belluru had a population of 6823 with 3581 males and 3242 females.

Tourist attractions
 Pink Palace
 Adichunchanagiri Hills
 Anjaneya Temple, Bellur Cross
Adi Madavaraya temple
Doddamma devi and Ranganatha swamy temples, Vaddarahalli

Image gallery

See also
 Mandya
 Districts of Karnataka

References

External links
 http://Mandya.nic.in/

Villages in Mandya district